Patterdale is a civil parish in the Eden District, Cumbria, England. It contains 37 listed buildings that are recorded in the National Heritage List for England. Of these, one is listed at Grade I, the highest of the three grades, one is at Grade II*, the middle grade, and the others are at Grade II, the lowest grade.  The parish is in the Lake District National Park, and contains the villages of Patterdale, Glenridding and Hartsop, but mainly consists of countryside, moorland and fells.  Most of the listed buildings are houses, cottages, farmhouses and farm buildings, and the other listed buildings are bridges and a church


Key

Buildings

References

Citations

Sources

Lists of listed buildings in Cumbria